Hughes Hall is a historic dormitory at the corner of West M and North Glenwood Streets, on the campus of Arkansas Tech University in Russellville, Arkansas.  It is a two-story stone building in a U-shaped plan, with a hip roof and stone foundation.  The roof of its front facade is pierced by two small hip-roofed dormers.  It was built as a classroom building in 1940, with funding support from the Works Progress Administration.  In 2009, it was converted into a dormitory.

The building was listed on the National Register of Historic Places in 1992.

See also
National Register of Historic Places listings in Pope County, Arkansas

References

University and college buildings on the National Register of Historic Places in Arkansas
Buildings and structures in Russellville, Arkansas
Arkansas Tech University
Works Progress Administration in Arkansas
1940 establishments in Arkansas
School buildings on the National Register of Historic Places in Arkansas
Late 19th and Early 20th Century American Movements architecture
School buildings completed in 1940